Itum-Kalinsky District (Iton-Qällan khoşt) is an administrative and municipal district (raion), one of the fifteen in the Chechen Republic, Russia. It is located in the south of the republic. Its administrative center is the rural locality (a selo) of Itum-Kale (Itum-Kali). Population:  6,083 (2002 Census). The population of Itum-Kale accounts for 19.5% of the district's total population.

References

Notes

Sources

Districts of Chechnya